Paul Carnegie-Jones (born 1985) is a New Zealand pianist.

Since 2008 he has been a concert accompanist and music director for Russian-born multi-platinum artist Yulia MacLean.

Discography

References

External links
 Official site

21st-century classical pianists
New Zealand classical pianists
Male classical pianists
People from Hastings, New Zealand
1985 births
Living people
21st-century male musicians